Goldich Crest is a peak,  high, between Mount Jason and Bull Pass in the Olympus Range of the McMurdo Dry Valleys, Antarctica. Gonzalez Spur extends east-southeast from the peak. The crest was named by the Advisory Committee on Antarctic Names (2004) after S.S. (Sam) Goldich of the Department of Geology, Northern Illinois University, DeKalb, Illinois (and later of the U.S. Geological Survey, Denver, Colorado); a participant in the McMurdo Dry Valleys Drilling Project, 1973–76.

References

Mountains of Victoria Land
McMurdo Dry Valleys